Mahasu Devta Temple (Mahasui: 𑚢𑚩𑚭𑚨𑚱 𑚛𑚲𑚦𑚙𑚭 𑚢𑚫𑚛𑚮𑚤), is located on the Tuini-Mori road at Hanol, Dehradun district, Uttarakhand,India and was built in the 9th century. The temple is dedicated to Mahasu Devta. Lord Mahasu is the chief deity of this area and is worshipped in Mahasu Devta Temple by the people of Hanol and nearby villages of Uttarakhand and Himachal Pradesh state of India. The temple was constructed in Kath-Kuni or Koti-Banal style of architecture and is included in the Archaeological Survey of India's list of the ancient temple in the Dehradun circle, Uttarakhand.

Mahasu Devta Temple is on the eastern bank of Tons River (Tamas) at Hanol village, near Chakrata, about 190 km from Dehradun, 156 km from Mussoorie and about 140 km from Shimla.

Hanol 
The name of the village according to the legend was kept after the name of Huna Bhatt, a Brahmin. It can also be derived from 'hanul' meaning fire. Before mahasu arrived, this place was used for torturing offenders with the heat of fire by putting them in the hollow of a big drum, placed horizontally and heated from below. Earlier the place was known as Chakrapur, and it is said to be the place to which the pandavas escaped from laksha graha or the Lakhmandal on River Yamuna. The village is at an altitude of 1,050 m above M.S.L. on the left bank of River Tons earlier known as River Tamas (meaning short-tempered). No water can be drawn from it for irrigation purposes, because of its precipitous banks and deep gorges. It is for this reason the river is called Karam Nashini. According to another tradition, the water of River Tons are the tears from the eyes of Bhubruvanan.

The temple village of Hanol is a sort of pilgrimage place for people living in vast areas in the mountainous parts of Uttarakhand, west of Yamuna River, The trans giri area of Sirmaur district and a major part of Shimla district of Himachal Pradesh.

Hanol is approachable from Tiuni, a well-known trijunction of roads on the Pabbar River after covering a distance of 15 km on an all-weather motorable road that meanders smoothly through the pine clad mountain slopes. Although the terrain through which the road passes is very narrow and by another side of the road one can see the river tons.
Besides his ancient and principal temple at Hanol, Mahasu Devta has number of temples scattered in his deitydom. Besides Hanol temples situated at villages namely Thaina, Basoi and Gabela are regarded as Thans (Abode) of Mahasu. Also the temples dedicated to Mahasu Devta birs (His two deputies) Kaulo and Shedkulia have exclusive temples for them in Tiuni and Raaigi.

There are many Mahasu Devta Temples in the whole Jaunsar-Bawar region, some famous of them are located at village Bisoi, Buraswa, Kotua, Laksiyar are in Uttarakhand and Nagheta in Sirmour HP. The number of temples of Mahasu and his brothers are situated at various places of Devghar, Jaunsar-Bawar and Sirmour areas.

About Mahasu Devta

In the deitydom, Mahasu Devta is not only the sole arbiter over the mortals, he also reigns supreme over the innumerable indigenous gods and goddesses. He exercises his authority over the religious dispensation of people and secular matters. Disputes among the people are settled through a unique LotaPani adjuration. For this purpose water is ritually filled in a metallic goblet in the name of Mahasu Devta by a neutral person, then the disputants are asked to drink that water in the name of Mahasu Devta. The party who has given the false statement suffers on drinking the water.

The age-old theocratic governance of Mahasu Devta, although acceptable to people and local rulers, was not taken kindly by the British authority. One of their officers, Major Young, found the authority of Mahasu Devta 'a great nuisance'. During land settlement of the territory under the British control in AD 1827 he felt that the traditional twelve-year sojourning of Mahasu (the Chalda Mahasu) with his large entourage to deitydom was extremely burdensome and exploitative to common people. To check the practice, Young passed a summary order in Kalsi in an assembly of the Senyanas banishing the Chalda Mahasu and his deputy attendants (birs) from Jaunsar and Bawar Parangna. That order, however, did not have lasting effect because the people regarded the Rohru tehsil for his verdict. The deity decision is always regarded as final and irrevocable.

Mahasu Devta is very touchy about the disposal of gold or gold ornaments by anyone of his subject to outsiders. The person involved in such offence may suffer the loss of property, a serious disease, or even life until he gets it back intact. However, that does not absolve the defaulter from the crime. As a punishment the defaulter is obliged to deposit the article in the treasury of deity. Therefore, the people in the deitydom have to be very careful about the transaction of silver and gold articles outside his realm. It is believed that the bullion in the Mahasudom, even if in the possession of people, belongs to the deity. If such gold goes outside his deitydom the person doing so provokes the ire of Mahasu Devta.

Legends 

Mahasu Devta appears in quadruple form as the four brothers. The legend tells when Krishna disappeared at the end of Dvapara Yuga, the Pandavas followed him. They cross the River Tons. Yudhishtra was fascinated by the beauty of place and asked Vishwakarma to build a temple here and stay with Draupadi for nine days. The place subsequently came to known as Hanol, after the name of Huna Bhatt.

At the start of Kali Yuga, demons wandered over Uttarakhand devouring people and devastating villages. The greatest demon was Kirmir who had devoured all the seven sons of a pious-hearted Brahmin named Huna Bhatt. Demon cast an evil eye and desired to have the Kirtaka wife of the Brahmin; she prayed to Lord Shiva to protect her chastity. Lord Shiva blinded Kirmir and thus she could run away to her husband. They then prayed to Hatkeshwari Devi of Hatkoti (ashtbhuji Durga) who advised the couple to go to the Kashmir mountains and offer prayer to Lord Shiva to help. They did, and Lord Shiva granted them their wish that all the evils will be killed shortly.

Huna Bhatt was told to go back to his home and perform certain rituals and worship devi. On doing so the shakti emerged from the ground with flames around and told Huna Bhatt to plough every Sunday a part of his field with a plough of solid silver with a shoe of pure gold having yoked a pair of bullocks who had never been put on yoke before. On the seventh Sunday the Mahasu brothers with their ministers and the army will come out and rid the people from the clutches of demon. Huna Bhatt did accordingly, but on sixth Sunday when he had turned on five furrows out of each sprang a deity from the first came Botha from second Pavasi, out of third Vasik and Chalda from the fourth one. All the brothers were called by a common affix of Mahasu (Char Mahasu). From the fifth furrow appeared their heavenly mother Devladli Devi and their ministers. Countless army sprang out like mushrooms from the field. Huna Bhatt did as directed and the whole army of the demon was killed by Mahasu brothers. Kirmir was taken by Chalda Devta in a ravine of Mount Khanda. The marks of his sword on the rock can be seen today.

During the absence of the Mahasu brothers, demon Keshi took control of Hanol. Chalda Devta and his warriors Shaidkulia, Kaolu and others set out with the army to the mountains of Masmor where Keshi had gone. The demon was killed; Chalda Devta returned jubilantly to visit with his heroes the places named by him. He divided the country among the brothers so that they may rule their respective territory and guard against calamities of all the people who would worship them as god and perform jagara.

However, a mistake erupted in the venture of the Mahasu brothers. In the beginning, Mahasu Devta had pledged their word to Huna Bhatt that they would appear on the seventh Sunday. Since they arrived a week earlier, the Mahasu brothers were hurt by the blade of Huna Bhatt's plough — he was in the field unaware of their untimely arrival. As a result, Botha was hurt in the knee and became unable to walk. Vasik's eye was damaged by the blade of grass which impaired his vision. Pavasi had a small piece cut out of his ear. Only Chalda and Devladli Mata remained unhurt. Thereafter Botha preferred to settle within his temple at Hanol on the right bank of river tons. Pavasi keep moving over his domain and spend years turn by turn at Hanol, Lakhmandal, Authana and Uttarkashi. Chalda, being sound of limb, was to exercise away in the whole dominion in the Botha Mahasu name — twelve years on end he roamed among his subjects.

Each of four deities has a bir (attendant). They are Kapala, Kaolu, Kailath and Shitkulia. All the birs have balyayinis (female helpers).

Jagara of Lord Mahasu 

The Jagara celebrated for Lord Mahasu is quintessential to his cult and is unheard of outside his deitydom. Held in the month of Bhadon on the eve of Naga chauth (Bhadraprada shukla chaturtha), i.e., the fourth day of the bright half. This day is very important because the lord appeared from the ground on that day. On this occasion, during the day the mohras images are ritually bathed and carried ceremoniously duly wrapped in the folds of a sheet of cloth. These are soiled by an ominous sight. No one is allowed to be near the image as the deity may feel offended and curse the defaulter. After the rituals the images are consigned to the altar for none to see, and one of them is kept in a palanquin for the consummation of ceremonies during the day. By sunset that image is also taken inside the temple and placed on the altar with others.

As the night falls, a tall, straight pole cut from a kail (blue pine) tree is planted firmly on the ground. On it a flag of deity is hoisted. Another pole of similar tree of much shorter length having number of forking branches is taken. Its branches are chopped off at about half of meter from the stem so that a large squarish slate can be securely placed over the branches. This is called chira. The goat reserved for the deity is brought near the altar and offered to the deity by sprinkling water over it. If the animal shivers (bijana), it signals acceptance by the deity.

As night gets darker, the men and women team around with the burning torches of resinous wood in their hands. They dance in a circle around chira. The fire keeps on burning on chira with more fuel fed to it throughout the night. Dancing and singing continues around the chira throughout the night on the beat of Nagaras and other instruments. At times people, people fall from the circle and more take their places so that chain is never broken. At times, a man or two would drop from the circle being possessed by deity or his deputy (shedkulia) starts shouting and crying in frenzy of divine afflatus.

In the Mahabharata era 

During the Mahabharat era, King Duryodhana came to Purola after traveling through Kullu and Kashmir. Duryodhana liked Purola so much that he decided to reside there. He prayed to Mahasu Devta for a piece of land. The deity accepted his pleas and made him the king of the area. King Duryodhana made Jakholi his capital village and constructed Mahasu Devta Temple. In medieval time the great Mughal emperor Akbar made frequent visits to the temple.

Shaant Festival at Hanol (May 2004)

A festival of shaant was held at Hanol, the principal seat of Botha Mahasu, from 22 May 2004 to 26 May 2004. There are three main types of ceremonies, namely khura shau (one hundred legs of animals sacrificed), munda shau (one hundred heads of animals sacrificed) and singhaan shau (one head of lon or at least representative a cat). This festival which was observed in May 2004 at hanol in which twenty-five goats are required to be sacrificed, twenty five is the minimum number of goats that can be sacrificed. Khura shau ceremonies locally called as shaant festivals are held after several years in the habitats where the tradition of such ceremonies is continuing since past. The second type of shaant ceremony Munda Shau is difficult to arrange in comparison to Khura shau as it involves hundred heads of animals. The shaant festival held at hanol in Jaunsar-Bawar region in Uttarakhand was arranged after about one hundred years. About fifty-two village gods (Gram Devtas) attended the shaant festival.

According to Pandit Devi Ram of Maneoti, tehsil chopal, who was among the pandits performing puja during the ceremony, told the eleven pandits conducted the puja during the ceremony in the temple for five days. According to him, the decision of stopping the practice of offering goats to the deities was taken in the ceremony and all the participating deities and their representatives (Vazirs), Excepting Shedkulia of Fateh Parvat in Uttarakhand, consented to stop sacrificial practices in their temples. Two other important decisions arrived at the ceremony (1) To allow entry of ladies in the temple,(2) To stop the practice of sacrificing animals in name of village gods.

Mahasu Devta fair 

Mahasu Devta fair is held every year in August. It is the most important religious fair of the local tribe. Basically Mahasu Devta fair at Hanol is celebrated by the Jaunsari tribe and people of other communities join them. This fair depicts the cultural harmony between the communities.

There is a deity idol inside the temple known as Chalta Mahasu. During the fair, this deity is taken out in procession. Large crowds walk on the both sides. The prayers are continued for three days and nights. They are accompanied by music and folk dance mainly performed by locals and people from nearby villages. The musicians and folk dancers from dehradun and nearby districts comes to participate in this fair.

The materials for performing rituals (like havan, etc.) are provided by the Government of India. Since the Mahasu Devta fair at Hanol is local, the majority of the people come from nearby districts of Uttarkashi, Tehri, Saharanpur, Sirmour, Shimla, kullu etc.

Mahasu Devta fair at Hanol is the best venue to view the cultural heritage and traditions of local tribes.

Palanquins of Mahasu Devta 

The palanquins of Mahasu Devta is generally of roof type-Box type design. In roof type-box type palanquins, the deity's image (Murti or Muharas) is hidden inside the box. Usually made up of silver and sometimes inlaid with gold, both the box and the roof are typically ornamented with repousse images of Shiva, Ganesha, Krishna, The Pandavas and Kauravas and Gopis. The placement of silver parasol at the peak of the roof and the four ball at each of the corner of the box reproduces the mandallic geometry of centre and four directions, the
visual signature of world-ordering sovereignty gives visual form to Mahasu's paramount status as "king of the gods". A woven silver cummerbund tied around the box, through which the deity's sword is slung, indicates the palanquin's anthropomorphic construction as the martial body of a demon-slaying ruler.

Architectural aspects of temple 

Architecturally Mahasu Devta Temple at Hanol is one of the rarest examples of perfect and harmonious blend of stone and wooden structure to form one composite grand edifice. The sanctum proper is a pure stone shikhara in classical Nagar style. The whole wooden structure is covered with a high pitched slated pent roof surmounted by a two-tiered conical canopy over it on which a gracefully tapered kalash pinnacle stands. The roof ends and the projection of balcony are ornamented with dangling fringes a pendent corner bells which sway with the slightest movement of breeze.

The stone built classical sanctum sanctorum enshrines many mohras and one bronze image. Those in front row from left to right are Chalda Mahasu (the Mahasu who keeps on moving), Devladli Devi (mother of Mahasu Devta), Kapala Bir (one of the four birs (attendants) of Mahasu Devta), and Shedkuliya (the attendant who emits the whistling sound). Behind them in the preceding order are Pavasi Devta, Kailu (a bir), Natari (polyandrous wife of four Mahasu brothers). All the face images are seated in a middle a small bronze image which is regarded as Botha Mahasu.

Entry to sanctum is restricted strictly for others except the pujari. Even he is required to undergo ritual ablution every time he enters the celestial realms; the tradition pujari of temple is a Brahmin. He is not supposed to eat meat, only eat food once a day, avoid proximity with other persons during the term of his deity as pujari.

In front of sanctum is a large room which functions as an extension to the sanctum where sacramental objects are stored. This room is called Bhandar. Entry to this room is restricted to Brahmins only. The gilded door of the bhandar is very interesting. It surface is profusely embossed with human and animal figures in a very bold manner depicting the episodes associated with the birth of Mahasu Devta. The door frame is intensively covered with coins nailed over one another through years but non of them are numismatic interest and range from recent past. The lion head is fitted with a gold brass ring that serves as a handle. Such ornamental door are common in temple near east of satluj. In front of the vestibule is a sabha mandap followed by an open frontal portico. All the four apartments of this temple are roofed separately. Vestibule and bhandar have a combined three-tiered pent roof with pyramid canopy. The frontal porch has a gable roof over it supported by two wooden pillars with an intermediate ornamental arch.

Unique aspects of temple 
The most unusual aspect of the temple is the two spherical rocks about one foot in diameter. The fun part is to lift these rocks on your shoulder and head and then throw them to the ground. It is believed that only a pious-hearted person can only lift up these rocks.

The hanging of trophies on the temple wall is another unique aspect. Matches are played between teams of local gods. On winning, the trophy is awarded and hanged on the interior walls.

On the premises one can notice numerous goats roaming. It is believed that whatever one wishes in this temple, Mahasu Devta fulfills it, provided that on the fulfillment one has to bring a certain number of goats to Mahasu Devta Temple. After prayers the goats are set free to roam on the premises.

Legend of Chaturmukha Naga 

Mahasu Devta has to yield before another powerful deity: the Chaturmukha Devta of the Kotgarh-Khaneti area of the Satluj valley in the Simla district. It is said that Chaturmukha Devta happened to be the guest of the Mahasu Devta at Hanol while he was returning from pilgrimage of Kedarnath. The devil attendant of Mahasu Devta, Shirpal, harassed the deity and his attendant during the night and they had to spend a sleepless night at Hanol. The Chaturmukha Devta took exception to the misconduct of that attendant. He made his displeasure known to Mahasu Devta and caused a man with his bullock yoked to a plough ram into his temple. Mahasu Devta begged for mercy, but Chaturmukh Devta can only be calmed down after the offender was surrendered to him as a captive. Shirpal later earned the confidence of Chaturmukh Devta who made him his wazir. And Build a Special Temple for Shirpal near his Temple. Shirpal Temple is also in Bhali, Kotgarh where The Singha and Bhalaik Family Worship him.

Pavasi Devata Temple

Pavasi Devta is the second brother of Mahasu Devta. The Pavasi Devta Temple is just across the River Tons on a hillock. The temple is about 2 km from Mahasu Devta Temple. A road from Mahasu Devta Temple goes one km downward toward the suspension bridge at the river. On crossing, one enters Thadiyar, a small village in Uttarkashi district. Then footpath goes up the hill about 1 km to reach Pavasi Devta Temple.

Visiting

Accommodation

The Garhwal Mandal Vikas Nigam guest house ( now under PPP mode with BIVA Hospitality) is the reasonable and comfortable accommodation option at Hanol. It has six rooms and a dormitory. Accommodation is also available on the premises of the temple.

Accessibility

The Mahasu Devta Temple is about 180 km from Dehradun via Chakrata. It takes about seven hours from this route. The road is narrow and difficult during rainy season. Another route to reach this temple is via Mussoorie, Purola, Naugaon. This route is much better than the former one and takes approximately the same time to reach. The temple is also connected to Shimla via Chaupal  and via Jubbal.

The nearest airport is the Jolly Grant Airport, Dehradun. The nearest railway terminus is also at Dehradun.

Best time to visit

In summer (March to May) The climate is very pleasant. Most of the pilgrims visit temple during this time.

In the rainy season (July to September) there is mild rainfall. Most of the roads are slippery during this season.

In winter (November to February) the weather is chilly.

References

External links

Archaeological Survey of India Dehradun Circle Site
Mahasu Devta Temple, Hanol, Official Website
mahasudevta mandir-lakshiyar

Hindu temples in Uttarakhand
Hindu pilgrimage sites in India
Tourist attractions in Dehradun